The Bismarck was a battleship of the German navy during World War II, named after Otto von Bismarck.

 Sink the Bismarck! is a 1960 war film about the sinking of the Bismarck starring Kenneth More and Dana Wynter
 Sink the Bismark is a 1960 Johnny Horton song inspired by the movie
 Sink the Bismarck (often abbreviated to "Sink the Biz") is also the name of a skill-based drinking game, which involves floating a glass in a larger container filled with beer, then pouring more beer into the glass without letting it sink.

For the sinking of the Bismarck battleship in 1941, see:
 Operation Rheinübung for Bismarck's sortie into the Atlantic on 18 May 1941
 Battle of the Denmark Strait for Bismarck's sinking of HMS Hood on 24 May 1941
 Last battle of the battleship Bismarck for the sinking of the Bismarck on 27 May 1941

Beer
BrewDog#Controversies